The Irish state has officially approved the following List of National Monuments in County Kerry. In Ireland, a structure or site may be deemed to be a "National Monument", and therefore worthy of state protection unless the government decides to demolish it. If the land adjoining to the monument is essential to protect it, this land may also be protected.

National Monuments 

 
|}

Sources 
  National Monuments in County Kerry

Kerry
National Monuments